Tôň (pronunciation: [tuoɲ], Hungarian pronunciation:) is a village and municipality in the Komárno District in the Nitra Region of south-west Slovakia.

History 
In historical records the village was first mentioned in 1268.

Geography 
The village lies at an altitude of 112 metres and covers an area of 9.499 km².
It has a population of about 835 people.

History 
In the 9th century, the territory of Tôň became part of the Kingdom of Hungary. In historical records the village was first mentioned in 1268.
After the Austro-Hungarian army disintegrated in November 1918, Czechoslovak troops occupied the area, later acknowledged internationally by the Treaty of Trianon. Between 1938 and 1945 Tôň once more  became part of Miklós Horthy's Hungary through the First Vienna Award. From 1945 until the Velvet Divorce, it was part of Czechoslovakia. Since then it has been part of Slovakia.

Ethnicity 
The village is about 90% Hungarian, 10% Slovak.

Facilities 
The village has a public library a gym and a football pitch.

Villages and municipalities in the Komárno District
Hungarian communities in Slovakia